Jagatpal Singh  was king of Pithoria in 19th century. He was ally of British East India Company. His father Jaimangal Singh and he made Pithoria business and cultural centre. He helped British in supression of Rebellion of 1857 in Ranchi.

Early life
He was son of King of Pithoria Jaimangal Singh. After his father he became king of Pithoria. He had palace which spread in land of 30 acres with two storey building and 100 rooms. The was temple of Shiva in pond of the palace. He was devotee of Shiva. He also made Shiva temple near his palace. People worship in the temple today also. He had done many works for his subjects. He was popular among his subjects. But due to his support of British during Rebellion of 1957, he became antagonist in history.

Rebellion of 1857
During 1857 rebellion, he helped British Captain Thomas Wilkinson. He employed his soldiers to check rebel Jamindar and their allies. He made garrison during rebellion which is located around 11 km north of Pithoria. Thakur Vishwanath Shahdeo and Surendra Nath Shahdeo attacked British in Pithoria but Jagatpal Singh protect British. After fight of several days, the rebel Jamindar and their allies lost battle. Thakur Viswanath Shahdeo caught and hanged in a tree near Ranchi school on 16 April 1958 due to his statement. Several other Rebel like Pandey Ganpat Rai also hanged due to his statement. His palace is now in ruins and thunderstorms fall in rainy season.

References

Asian kings
History of Jharkhand
People from Ranchi district
19th-century Indian royalty